The Johannesburg Ring Road is a set of freeways that circle the city of Johannesburg, South Africa and service the City of Johannesburg Metropolitan Municipality. The entire Ring Road is an e-toll highway (with open road tolling) and is approximately 83 km long.

History

Construction on the Ring Road began in the late 1960s. Sections of the Eastern Bypass first opened in 1971 while the last section of the Southern Bypass opened in 1986.

The Ring Road had two major aims when it was built: to allow traffic not destined for Johannesburg to bypass the city along a number of high-speed freeways in quick and easy fashion and also to allow for the mobility of Apartheid South African Army to defend the state from hostile neighbours or to quell violence in black townships during a state of emergency.

The Route

The Road is composed of three freeways that converge on the city, and form an  loop around Johannesburg. The 3 freeways that create the Ring Road include the N3 Eastern Bypass, the N1 Western Bypass and the N12 Southern Bypass.

The entire road was built with asphalt and is mostly 8 lanes wide throughout (4 lanes in either direction), with parts having up to 12 lanes wide in some areas (6 lanes in either direction), the Johannesburg Ring Road is frequently clogged with traffic.

The main intersections that complete the ring road include the Elands Interchange, that connects the N3 Eastern Bypass with the N12 Southern Bypass, the Diepkloof Interchange, that connects the N12 Southern Bypass with the N1 Western Bypass and finally the Buccleuch Interchange connecting the N1 Western Bypass with the N3 Eastern Bypass.

References

Streets and roads of Johannesburg
Ring roads in South Africa
Johannesburg Ring Road
 National Roads in South Africa
 Toll roads in South Africa